Åbjør is a small rural area in the eastern Norway region known as Valdres.  It is a farming area ("bygd") that covers approximately 30 dairy farms.  Estimated population is 200-250.

The area used to house a local school and general store, but these were closed down. Today the only bus that stops in the area is the bus to Gol from Fagernes, but it runs infrequently, and only has three stops in Åbjør, none of which is in the center of the area.

Åbjør gets its name from the river Åbjøra which runs through the area.  The section of the river that passes through Åbjør has been named the local "Grand Canyon" by several books and tourist brochures. Some companies take tourists on guided walks down the river.

Attractions
The upper main road (E16) has views of the Nord-Aurdal valley.  It is also possible to walk up to the top of the hillside from the main road to Høgesyn to take in one of these views. Some tourists take a break on their way from Gol to Fagernes or Oslo along the roadside to admire the view.

Apart from this, the river Åbjøra is the main attraction.

Valdres